Samuel Leeke (1754–1806) JP of Havant, was Deputy Lieutenant for the Hampshire a major landowner and magistrate who died joining others in quelling a riot.

He was the son of Samuel Leeke, of Portsmouth.  Samuel Leeke snr had been bequeathed Portsea manor by the previous owner John Moody; its manor house remains in the Leeke family. Leeke snr was also bequeathed a share of Havant manor. He died in 1775.

Leeke died "from the effects of over-exertion in the suppression of a riot".

Family
Samuel Leeke married Sophia, daughter of Capt. Richard Bargus of Fareham and Cheltenham, RN. She died on 4 April 1847. Their children were:
 
Thomas Samuel – a Lieutenant in the Royal Navy, killed in the Napoleonic Wars off Cadiz, 2 November 1810.
Urania, married Admiral Sir Edward Tucker.
Ann Sophia
Henry John (later Sir Henry), Royal Navy Admiral 
William, army officer, Waterloo veteran and historian, clergyman
Emily, married 8 January 1822, Capt. Wilson Braddyll Bigland, R. N

Sophia

Notes

External links
Details of Samuel Leeke's will

Deputy Lieutenants of Hampshire
1806 deaths
1754 births